Abby Kirstyn Burrows (born 29 January 1977) is a New Zealand former cricketer who played as a right-arm medium bowler. She appeared in 9 One Day Internationals for New Zealand between 2009 and 2010. She played domestic cricket for Central Districts.

References

External links

1977 births
Living people
Sportspeople from Whakatāne
New Zealand women cricketers
New Zealand women One Day International cricketers
Central Districts Hinds cricketers